Stefan Naydenov (16 August 1957 – 3 November 2010) was a Bulgarian footballer who played as an attacking midfielder, most notably for Spartak Varna. During his time with Spartak he was nicknamed Falcao by fans. He is the club's record goalscorer in the top league with 56 goals.

Naydenov played 6 times for the Bulgarian national team, scoring one goal.

References

1957 births
2010 deaths
Bulgarian footballers
Bulgaria international footballers
FC Montana players
PFC Beroe Stara Zagora players
PFC Spartak Varna players
PFC Cherno More Varna players
First Professional Football League (Bulgaria) players
Association football midfielders